On June 6, 2017, a bomb explosion outside the Jama Masjid, a historic mosque in the western city of Herat in Afghanistan killed at least 7 civilians, and wounded at least 15 others.

Attack
A bomb hidden in a rickshaw detonated near the Jama Masjid, a 12th-century mosque, killing seven people and injuring at least fifteen more. People were gathering at the mosque for Ramadan prayers.  The Taliban denied responsibility for the attack in a statement to Al-Jazeera.

References 

2017 murders in Afghanistan
Improvised explosive device bombings in Afghanistan
Islamic terrorist incidents in 2017
June 2017 crimes in Asia
Mass murder in 2017
Mass murder in Afghanistan
Terrorist incidents in Afghanistan in 2017
War in Afghanistan (2001–2021)
History of Herat
Attacks on religious buildings and structures in Afghanistan
Building bombings in Afghanistan